Oliver S. Powell (September 17, 1896 - July 26, 1963) was an American economist, educator and author who was a member of the Federal Reserve Board of Governors from 1949 to 1952. After leaving the Federal Reserve Board, Powell was elected as president and CEO of the Federal Reserve Bank of Minneapolis from 1952 to 1957.

He was born in White Rock, South Dakota.

References

1896 births
1963 deaths
People from South Dakota
Federal Reserve System governors
Truman administration personnel
Eisenhower administration personnel
Federal Reserve Bank of Minneapolis presidents
South Dakota Democrats